, also known as Fireworks, Should We See It from the Side or the Bottom? is a 2017 Japanese animated romance film based on Shunji Iwai's live-action television film of the same name. It received mixed reviews from critics who praised it for music and animation, but criticized the narrative and characterization. It is the sixth highest-grossing anime film of 2017 and has grossed over  worldwide. It was also released by Madman Entertainment, Anime Limited and GKIDS.

Plot
Norimichi Shimada and Nazuna Oikawa live in the town of Moshimo (Japanese for "if"). The students make a bet regarding whether the fireworks are either round or flat in the sky. After Nazuna finds a small glass marble, she, Norimichi and Yusuke compete in the swimming pool race. Yusuke wins and Nazuna asks him to go on a date. Nazuna packs a suitcase and plans to leave home. Yusuke bails on the date and Nazuna is taken home by her mother. Norimichi throws the marble, wishing for luck and causing it to rewind time. Back when the race occurred, Norimichi wins this time around and Nazuna asks him on a date. They head to the train station, but are caught once again by Nazuna's mother and her fiance. Norimichi learns that the fireworks are flat and is aware he is in an alternate timeline. He wishes for another chance to escape with Nazuna. He throws the marble from a lighthouse and reverses time again. He helps her elude the family and board the train. They are caught again by the others. When Yusuke pushes the two off the balcony, Norimichi uses the marble once again, wishing for no one to see them. Time jumps back again and the train takes a different route, leaving the two in the same town encapsulated in a glass dome. After a pyrotechnician uses the marble as a leftover firework charge, it explodes in the sky. After seeing the future within the shard, Nazuna asks Norimichi where will they see next. The next day, the school notices the absence of Norimichi and Nazuna.

Voice cast

Production
On December 7, 2016, the film was announced with a release date of August 2017. Hitoshi Ōne added modern elements of the film. The cast and crew were also announced. On April 14, 2017, a second teaser trailer for the film was released. A 30-second trailer, the third promotional video for the film, was released in June 2017. The film's theme song, "Uchiage Hanabi", is performed by Daoko and Kenshi Yonezu. The music video has garnered more than 500 million views on YouTube, and is 1050th place on Top Viewed Videos on YouTube.

Release
The film premiered in Japan on August 18, 2017, and in the United Kingdom on October 15, 2017. It was distributed in 110 countries and regions in July 2017. Edko Films Ltd released the film in Hong Kong on October 31, 2017. Madman Entertainment released the film on October 5, 2017. It was released in the United Kingdom on November 15, 2017. Madness Entertainment released the film in Mexico on February 16, 2018. GKIDS premiered the film in the United States on July 3, 2018, with the wide release on July 4, 2018. To promote the release, GKIDS released the trailer and images on May 23, 2018.

Reception

Box office
The film placed at No. 4 on the second weekend. It stayed at No. 4 on the third weekend, where it grossed  from 78,000 admissions and earned a total of ¥1.1 billion. The film had grossed  in Japan.

Critical response
On review aggregator website Rotten Tomatoes, the film has an approval rating of 43% based on 30 reviews, with an average rating of 4.94/10. The site's critical consensus states "Fireworks seeks sparks in an ambitious blend of storytelling genres, but this misguided anime effort never truly takes flight". On Metacritic, which assigns a normalized rating, the film has a score 40 out of 100, based on 10 critics, indicating "mixed or average reviews". The film received praise before it was released from several critics and journalists. Musician Koremasa Uno lauded the voice acting and said the film "doesn't feel like a work from Iwai or Hitoshi Ōne, the scriptwriter. Rather, it feels more like the anime of the studio creating it, Shaft, and its producer, Genki Kawamura." Film writer Tatsuya Masutō wrote on his Twitter account that the "expectations surrounding the film did not disappoint, and the anime could be better than the original live-action drama." He also noted that the anime is "more than just a remake" and the "90-minute run time compared to the 50-minute original helps add to the content". Kim Morrissy of Anime News Network gave the film an "B" grade and applauded the "great music and voice acting" and the "simple yet emotionally compelling plot" but criticized the film's production values and visuals that "don't really add anything to the film except to broadcast that it was made by SHAFT". Mark Schilling of The Japan Times gave the film a rating of 3½ out of 5 stars and praised the film's "pure-hearted love story". Mark concluded the review by writing, "Fireworks nails it again and again—or maybe that was just me, slipping back into long-ago dreams of the perfect girl gazing into my soul, forever out of reach."

Accolades

References

External links
  
 
 
 
 
 
 
 
 
 

2017 films
2017 anime films
2017 science fiction films
Animated drama films
Animated films about time travel
Anime film remakes
Drama anime and manga
Films based on television plays
Films about runaways
Films about wish fulfillment
Japanese animated science fiction films
Japanese children's films
2010s Japanese-language films
Japanese science fiction drama films
Shaft (company)
Soft science fiction films
Toho animated films